The 2009–10 Ugandan Super League was the 43rd season of the official Ugandan football championship, the top-level football league of Uganda.

Overview
The 2009–10 Uganda Super League was contested by 18 teams and was won by Bunamwaya SC, while Boroboro Tigers FC, Maji FC, Iganga Town Council FC, Hoima and Arua Central FC were relegated.

League standings

Footnotes

External links
 Uganda - List of Champions - RSSSF (Hans Schöggl)
 Ugandan Football League Tables - League321.com
 Uganda Super League 2009/10 - FootballScores
 Uganda Super League 2009/10 - Futaa
 Uganda Super League 2009/10 - SoccerVista
 Uganda Super League 2009/10 - TablesLeague

Ugandan Super League seasons
Uganda Super League
Super League